was a Japanese daimyō of the mid-Edo period.

The Makino were identified as one of the fudai or insider daimyō clans which were hereditary vassals or allies of the Tokugawa clan, in contrast with the tozama or outsider clans.

Makino clan genealogy
The fudai Makino clan originated in 16th century Mikawa Province. Their elevation in status by Toyotomi Hideyoshi dates from 1588.  They claim descent from Takechiuchi no Sukune, who was a legendary Statesman   and lover of the legendary Empress Jingū.

Sadamichi was part of a cadet branch of the Makino which was created in 1680.  These Makino resided successively at Sekiyado Domain in Shimōsa Province in 1683 ; at Yoshida Domain at Mikawa Province in 1705;  at Nabeoka Domain in Hyūga Province in 1712; and, from 1747 through 1868 at Kasama Domain (80,000 koku) in Hitachi Province. 

The head of this clan line was ennobled as a "Viscount" in the Meiji period.

Tokugawa official
Sadamichi served the Tokugawa shogunate as its nineteenth Kyoto shoshidai in the period spanning July 2, 1742, through October 28, 1749.  Sadamichi was the father of Makino Sadanaga, who was the twenty-eighth shoshidai.  He would be distantly related to the fifty-fifth shoshidai, Makino Tadayuki (1824–1878), who was descended from the elder Makino branch.

Notes

References
 Appert, Georges and H. Kinoshita. (1888).  Ancien Japon. Tokyo: Imprimerie Kokubunsha.
 Meyer, Eva-Maria. (1999).  Japan's Kaiserhof in de Edo-Zeit: Unter besonderer Berücksichtigung der Jahre 1846 bis 1867. Münster: Tagenbuch. 
 Papinot, Edmond. (1906) Dictionnaire d'histoire et de géographie du japon. Tokyo: Librarie Sansaisha...Click link for digitized 1906 Nobiliaire du japon (2003)
 Sasaki Suguru. (2002). Boshin sensō: haisha no Meiji ishin. Tokyo: Chūōkōron-shinsha.

External links
 National Diet Library:  photo of late-Edo period residence of Kasama (Makino) clan

Fudai daimyo
Makino clan
Kyoto Shoshidai
Hatamoto
1707 births
1749 deaths

ja:牧野貞長